The Patriotic Leagues (Spanish: Ligas patrióticas) were nationalistic political groups in Argentina and Chile active from the 1910s to the 1930s. The Patriotic Leagues were characterized by actions against foreigners and opposition towards labour movements. They were often constituted as paramilitary groups or secret societies.

In Argentina

The Argentine Patriotic League (Liga Patriótica Argentina) was a Nacionalista paramilitary group, officially created in Buenos Aires on January 16, 1919, during the Tragic week events. Presided over by Manuel Carlés, a professor at the Military College and the Escuela Superior de Guerra, it also counted among its members the deputy Santiago G. O'Farrell (1861-1926). The League was merged into the Argentine Civic Legion in 1931.

In Chile
In Chile the Patriotic Leagues appeared in 1910. Even if they appeared in several Chilean cities they concentrated their activity in the provinces of Antofagasta, Tarapacá and Tacna, those that were annexed during the War of the Pacific (1879-1883). In these places the Patriotic Leagues launched attacks against Peruvian newspapers, societies and citizens contributing to the Chilenization of Tacna, Arica and Tarapacá. The passivity of the Chilean authorities of Iquique helped the Patriotic Leagues to achieve their principal goal: to frighten the Tarapacán families of Peruvian origin. The situation was particularly problematic in Arica and Tacna, where a plebiscite was to determine their national future as either under the rule of Chile or Peru. The plebiscite in the end was never held, and the solution between both South American countries was achieved through the Tacna–Arica compromise.

See also 

 Expulsion of Chileans from Bolivia and Peru in 1879

Notes

References

Far-right politics in Argentina
Far-right politics in Chile
20th century in Argentina
20th century in Chile
Paramilitary organisations based in Argentina
Ethnic cleansing in the Americas
Paramilitary organisations based in Chile